The Grosser Mythen (also Grosse Mythe) is a mountain in the Schwyzer Alps  of Central Switzerland. The mountain lies in the canton of Schwyz, to the east of the town of Schwyz, and to the south of the village of Alpthal in the valley of the river Alp.

It is accessible from the Holzegg by a hiking trail which is opened during the summer months only.
Geologically the Mythen is a penninic Klippe.

The name is pronounced  [ˈmiːtən]; it is in origin the plural referring to the Grosser and Kleiner Mythen collectively, each of which had the name Mythe (feminine) in the singular. 
The name is unrelated to the now-homographic German word for "myth"; Weibel (1973) derives it from Latin meta "cone, pyramid". Until the late 19th century, the name of the mountain was still feminine, die Grosse Mythe; after c. 1870, the masculine gender became increasingly common in written German although dialectically the feminine remains current.

References

External links

 Grosser Mythen on Hikr

Mountains of the Alps
Mountains of Switzerland
Mountains of the canton of Schwyz
One-thousanders of Switzerland